The Clan Hamilton, or House of Hamilton, is a Scottish clan of the Scottish Lowlands.

History

Origins of the house

The Hamilton chiefs descend from Walter fitz Gilbert of Hambledon who appears in a charter to the Monastery of Paisley in about 1294. His lands appear to have originally been in Renfrewshire, however, his support for Robert the Bruce rewarded him with lands in Lanarkshire and the Lothians These lands included Cadzow, which later became the town of Hamilton, South Lanarkshire.

Wars of Scottish Independence
As already mentioned Walter Fitz Gilbert was rewarded with lands for his support of king Robert the Bruce. Walter's son, David, fought at the Battle of Neville's Cross for David II of Scotland in 1346. David was captured and was not released until a substantial ransom was paid.

15th and 16th centuries

In 1474, James Hamilton, 1st Lord Hamilton, married Princess Mary, daughter of James II of Scotland Their son was James Hamilton, 1st Earl of Arran. The family extended Brodick Castle on the Isle of Arran. The second Earl of Arran, James Hamilton, Duke of Châtellerault, was heir to the throne of both James IV of Scotland and Mary, Queen of Scots. He was made regent of Scotland while the queen was still a child and proposed to marry his son to her, in order to secure his claim to the throne. At this time Friar Mark Hamilton wrote a family history.  

However, the royal marriage did not take place and Mary married an heir to the French throne instead. James Hamilton was created Duke of Châtellerault because he had figured prominently in the marriage negotiations with France. In 1561, he was sent into exile for five years because he openly opposed Mary's marriage to Henry Stuart, Lord Darnley, having had his hopes rekindled when Mary's marriage ended upon the death of the Dauphin of France.

James Hamilton of Bothwellhaugh was a Scottish supporter of Mary, Queen of Scots, who assassinated James Stewart, 1st Earl of Moray, Regent of Scotland, in January 1570.

The 4th Earl of Arran, James Hamilton, 2nd Marquess of Hamilton became Lord Chancellor of Scotland and was made keeper of both of the strategic royal castles; Edinburgh Castle and Stirling Castle. He had been advanced to the rank of marquess in 1599. His brother was Claud Hamilton, 1st Lord Paisley, who had been created Lord Paisley in 1587 and later Lord Abercorn. This branch of the family also prospered and Abercorn was advanced to an earldom and later a dukedom in 1868.

17th century and civil war

The third Marquess, James Hamilton, 1st Duke of Hamilton was a staunch supporter of Charles I. Charles rewarded him with the dukedom in 1643, which made Hamilton the premier peer in Scotland. Hamilton led a royalist army into England but was defeated at the Battle of Preston (1648) by the Parliamentarians of Oliver Cromwell. Hamilton was later executed in 1649 at Whitehall shortly before the king met the same fate. Hamilton's brother, William Hamilton, 2nd Duke of Hamilton was also a brave soldier but was killed at the Battle of Worcester in 1651. The title passed to Anne Hamilton, 3rd Duchess of Hamilton, daughter of the first Duke. She was a woman of great intellect but she inherited estates heavily burdened by debt. Matters were made worse with her kinsman Hamilton, Earl of Abercorn, challenged her right to succeed to the title. Anne married William Douglas, 1st Earl of Selkirk (later Duke of Hamilton). Their son was James Hamilton, 4th Duke of Hamilton who was killed in a controversial duel in London in 1712.

Seat of the chief

Hamilton Palace in Hamilton, South Lanarkshire, had been the family's seat from the 13th century. Built by Duchess Anne, and her husband William Douglas, 3rd Duke of Hamilton, it had the distinction of being one of the largest non-royal palaces in Europe, reaching its greatest extent under the 10th and the 11th dukes in the mid nineteenth century.

Excessive subsidence of the palace caused by the family's mines led to its condemnation and demolition in 1921. The 13th Duke then moved to Dungavel House, near Strathaven. This was where deputy-führer Rudolf Hess aimed to reach during his doomed peace mission to see the Douglas, 14th Duke of Hamilton in 1941.

In 1947, Dungavel was sold to the coal board, and then on to the government, who turned it into an open prison. Currently, it is the site of a controversial holding centre for asylum-seekers.

The family moved to Lennoxlove House in East Lothian, which remains the residence of the current Duke.

Other properties

Brodick Castle, Brodick, Isle of Arran
Cadzow Castle, Hamilton, Lanarkshire
Chelsea Place, London
Craignethan Castle, South Lanarkshire
Palace of Holyroodhouse, Edinburgh
Kinneil House, Bo'ness, West Lothian
Lochranza Castle, Lochranza, Isle of Arran
Redhouse Tower, Longniddry, East Lothian

Tartan

Swedish descendants 
Malcolm Hamilton Archbishop of Cashel, first son was Hugh Hamilton, 1st Viscount of Glenawly, a soldier in Swedish service, who in Sweden was created baron of Deserf. Captain John Hamilton of Monea was Malcolm's younger son. His sons, Malcolm and Hugo, went to Swedish service in 1655 and were in 1689 created barons of Hagaby. They stayed in Swedish service and Malcolm's son Gustav David Hamilton was named the title of count in 1751, and in 1765 he gained the rank of field marshal.

German branch
 (1642–1717) went after Glorious Revolution to Germany, where he served for Philip William, Elector Palatine.

The last of his descendants was Maximilian von Hamilton, bishop of Olomouc (1714–1776).

See also

Duke of Hamilton
Duke of Abercorn
Earl of Selkirk
Earl of Arran (Scotland)
Viscount Boyne
Lord Belhaven and Stenton
Baron Hamilton of Dalzell
Lennoxlove House
Hamilton family – descendants of the Hamilton clan in the United States

References

Further reading
 
Hamilton at ElectricScotland.com
Clan Hamilton at ScotClans
Hamilton Surname DNA Project
Clan Hamilton Society

Hamilton
Hamilton, South Lanarkshire
Lanarkshire
 
Scottish Lowlands